Redcliffe Airport  is an aerodrome serving Redcliffe in Moreton Bay Region, Queensland, Australia. The facility is owned and operated by Moreton Bay Regional Council, following the amalgamation of the Redcliffe City Council.

Facilities
It is equipped with pilot activated low intensity runway lighting for night operations and the aerodrome also has refuelling facilities. There is no control tower and pilots must co-ordinate aircraft movements using a Common Traffic Advisory Frequency (CTAF).

The airfield is home to a number of aviation training schools and aircraft maintenance facilities that service the SE QLD region. The Redcliffe Aero Club is based at the airport and provides pilot training, aircraft hire and charter services. Other training organisations include Aeropower (Helicopters), Queensland Helicopter School (Helicopters), Aircraft Australia (Aeroplane), Fly Now (Aeroplane) and Bob Tait's Theory School.

Emergency and medical transfer aircraft now meet ambulances at the airfield since the closure of the Redcliffe Hospital Helipad in 2014.

Each year in August for World Helicopter Day a large open day event is held and is one of the biggest helicopter events in the southern hemisphere.

Fuel services at the airfield include bowsers for Jet A1 and AVGAS.

Airlines and destinations

Urban Encroachment
Like many small town airports, Redcliffe Airport has slowly seen residential development approved that places houses in what has previously been buffer zones or wetlands. Users of the airfield have set up a noise monitoring program to help identify noise hotspots and to educate local residents on the noise-abatement procedures already adhered to by pilots.

See also
 List of airports in Queensland

References

External links

 Redcliffe Aero Club
 Flying-Monster
 Aviate Downunder
Aeropower Flight School (Helicopter Training)

Airports in Queensland
Buildings and structures in Moreton Bay Region
Rothwell, Queensland